John James MacInnes (July 1, 1925 – March 6, 1983) was a Canadian professional ice hockey goaltender and NCAA hockey head coach. He was born in Toronto, Ontario.

Playing career
MacInnes was a goalie at the University of Michigan, helping the Wolverines to a pair of league titles and a third-place finish at the 1950 NCAA championship. MacInnes also played for farm teams of the Boston Bruins and the Detroit Red Wings before becoming director of the Ann Arbor Amateur Hockey League. He held that position until leaving to become head coach at Michigan Technological University.

Coaching career
MacInnes was the head coach of the Michigan Tech Huskies from the 1956-57 season through 1981-82. His teams won three NCAA championships and seven Western Collegiate Hockey Association titles during his 26 seasons as head coach. He was named NCAA Coach of the Year twice, after the 1969-70 and 1975-76 seasons. He was also named WCHA Coach of the Year 5 times, in 1960, 1962, 1966, 1971 and 1976.

His record as Michigan Tech's coach was 555-295-39.

During his final season as coach MacInnes' health began to fail and he announced in February that he would be stepping down at the end of the season. Less than a year later he died at the age of 57.

Head coaching record

Honors and awards
U.P. Sports Hall of Fame (Charter member, March 11, 1972)
Great Lakes Invitational Trophy named after MacInnes (December 12, 1982)
Michigan Tech Sports Hall of Fame (Charter member, 1984)
Won NHL's Lester Patrick Trophy (January 7, 1986)
Michigan Tech's Student Ice Arena renamed the John J. MacInnes Student Ice Arena (August 1991)
Legend of College Hockey Award from Hobey Baker Committee (April 17, 1999)
United States Hockey Hall of Fame (August 15, 2007)

See also
List of college men's ice hockey coaches with 400 wins
 University of Michigan Athletic Hall of Honor

References

External links

1925 births
1983 deaths
Canadian ice hockey goaltenders
Ice hockey people from Toronto
Lester Patrick Trophy recipients
Michigan Tech Huskies men's ice hockey coaches
Michigan Wolverines men's ice hockey players
United States Hockey Hall of Fame inductees